Tabernaemontana sambiranensis is a species of plant in the family Apocynaceae. It is found in northern Madagascar, off the coast of southeastern Africa.

References

sambiranensis